Chester Center can refer to:

Chester Center, Connecticut
Chester Center Historic District, Massachusetts